Ath Thaqab is an abandoned village in Qatar, located in the municipality of Ash Shamal, approximately 110 km away from the capital Doha. It is close to the settlements of Al Ruwaydah and Al Khuwayr, the latter of which is only 3 miles away. Thaqab Fort is located in the vicinity of the settlement.

History
Archaeological evidence has shown that Thaqab has been inhabited since the 10th century. In J.G. Lorimer's Gazetteer of the Persian Gulf, it is stated that in 1908, Ath Thaqab accommodated a well from which the inhabitants of the nearby settlement of Al Khuwayr would fetch their water. The well was described as being approximately 35 feet deep and yielding good water.

In the early 20th century, the Bedouins of the Naim tribe living in the region of Zubarah were involved in conflicts with the Al Thani who ruled Qatar. Though they were loyal to the Al Khalifa, the ruling family of Bahrain, the tribe agreed to abide by the rules set by Qatar's then-emir, Abdullah bin Jassim Al Thani. In July 1937, Sheikh Abdullah Al Thani reported to the British agency that he was to take action against the Naim tribe who were residing in Ath Thaqab over their perceived violation of the country's laws. For their part, the tribal leader of the Naim claimed that Abdullah Al Thani had "stolen their cattle" and had set fire to the Naim's houses and villages before and after his decree. 

Hostilities came to a boiling point when an armed force sent by Abdullah Al Thani, numbering in the hundreds, confronted around 60 armed men of the Naim who were encamped inside Ath Thaqab Fort. According to Rashid bin Mohammed, upon encountering the Qatari loyalists, he and his troops surrendered, but four of his men were shot and killed anyway. Abdullah Al Thani's forces continued to capture the fort and occupy the villages of Ath Thaqab, Freiha, Al `Arish and Al Khuwayr, whose inhabitants were among the Naim supporters. After the Naim had conceded defeat, Abdullah Al Thani confiscated most of their weapons, including 40 rifles from the people of Ath Thaqab, and some of their livestock.

Ath Thaqab Fort
Ath Thaqab Fort is rectangular in shape and has four towers. A courtyard with stairs leading to the towers are in the center of the fort. It dates to somewhere between the 17th and 19th century.

Gallery
''Click on the thumbnail to enlarge.

References

External links
Geographic.org

Populated places in Al Shamal
Archaeological sites in Qatar